Air Kasthamandap Pvt. Ltd. was an airline based in Nepal which started operations in 2009. It had its headquarters in Kathmandu and operated scheduled and charter flights and cargo flights in Western Nepal.

History
Air Kasthamandap started operations in 2009 with two brand new PAC P-750 XSTOL aircraft.
In June 2017, the Civil Aviation Authority of Nepal revoked Air Kasthamandap's Air operator's certificate.

Destinations
Air Kasthamandap regularly served the following destinations on passenger or cargo service. These were cancelled either at the closure of operations or before:

Fleet
At the time of closure, Air Kasthamandap operated the following aircraft:

Accidents and incidents
2016 Air Kasthamandap PAC 750XL crash  - On 26 February 2016, an Air Kasthamandap PAC 750XL aircraft with eleven people on board crashed at Chilkhaya in Kalikot District, Nepal, killing two crew members and injuring all nine passengers on board.

References

External links

  via Wayback Machine

Defunct airlines of Nepal
Airlines established in 2009
2009 establishments in Nepal
2017 disestablishments in Nepal